Cordylosaurus (from  , 'club' and  , 'lizard') is a monotypic genus of lizards. It consists of the following single species.
Blue-black plated lizard, Cordylosaurus subtessellatus

References

Gerrhosauridae
Monotypic lizard genera
Taxa named by John Edward Gray